Dylan Maltz is a professional American lacrosse player currently signed with the Philadelphia Wings in the National Lacrosse League. Maltz played college lacrosse for Syracuse University and University of Maryland as an attackman.

College career 
Maltz was recruited out of high school. He started playing for the Syracuse Orange men's lacrosse team in 2014. He played in a total of six games during his time with Syracuse recording 3 goals and one assist.

Following his freshman year at Syracuse, Maltz transferred to University of Maryland. As a sophomore, Maltz played 18 games, totaling 16 points on 11 goals and five assists. As a junior, Maltz recorded 29 goals and 9 assists in 20 games, totaling a career-high of 38 points.

In 2017, Maltz scored two goals and added an assist in the NCAA Division I men's lacrosse championship game against Ohio State University helping the Maryland Terrapins to a 9-6 championship victory. Maltz finished his college career with 72 goals, 21 assists and 56 ground balls.

Professional career 
Maltz previously played in Major League Lacrosse and the Premier Lacrosse League. From 2018 to 2020, he scored 18 goals and recorded 2 assists during the 11 games he played for Charlotte Hounds and Whipsnakes LC.

In March 2021, Maltz joined the National lacrosse league when he signed with the Philadelphia Wings.

References 

Living people
American lacrosse players
Syracuse Orange men's lacrosse players
Maryland Terrapins men's lacrosse players
Major League Lacrosse players
Philadelphia Wings players
People from Port Jefferson, New York
People from Ashburn, Virginia
1994 births